Andrew Bernstein is an American philosopher. He is a proponent of Objectivism, the philosophy of Ayn Rand, and the author of several books, both fiction and non-fiction.

Education and career
He is the author of The Capitalist Manifesto: The Historic, Economic, and Philosophic Case for Laissez-Faire, Capitalism Unbound: The Incontestable Case for Individual Rights and Objectivism in One Lesson, as well as two novels, Heart of a Pagan and A Dearth of Eagles. He also authored the CliffsNotes for Ayn Rand's Atlas Shrugged, The Fountainhead, and Anthem, and has contributed essays to volumes such as Essays on Ayn Rand's Anthem and Essays on Ayn Rand's We the Living.  His op-eds have appeared in publications such as the San Francisco Chronicle, the Chicago Tribune, The Baltimore Sun, The Atlanta Constitution, The Washington Times, The Los Angeles Daily News, and the Houston Chronicle. He has contributed a number of essays, op-eds, and reviews to The Objective Standard. He is affiliated with the Ayn Rand Institute and the New York Heroes Society, an Ayn Rand advocacy organization, and is known for his public defense of Objectivism, particularly its support for laissez-faire capitalism.

Bibliography

Non-fiction
 CliffsNotes on Rand's Atlas Shrugged, 2000
 CliffsNotes on Rand's The Fountainhead, 2000
 The Capitalist Manifesto: The Historic, Economic, and Philosophic Case for Laissez-Faire, 2005
 Objectivism in One Lesson: An Introduction to the Philosophy of Ayn Rand, 2008
 Capitalism Unbound: The Incontestable Case for Individual Rights, 2010
 Capitalist Solutions: A Philosophy of American Moral Dilemmas, 2011
Heroes, Legends, Champions: Why Heroism Matters, 2020

Fiction
 Heart of a Pagan: The Story of Swoop, 2002
 A Dearth of Eagles, 2017

References

External links

 Official website
 The Bernstein Declaration: On the Principles and Possibilities of Capitalism

20th-century American philosophers
21st-century American philosophers
Philosophers from New York (state)
Atheist philosophers
American atheism activists
Objectivists
Objectivism scholars
Living people
State University of New York faculty
Marist College faculty
20th-century atheists
21st-century atheists
Year of birth missing (living people)